The 1993 European Ladies' Team Championship took place 7–11 July at Royal The Hague Golf & Country Club in Wassenaar, Netherlands. It was the 18th women's golf amateur European Ladies' Team Championship.

Venue 
The course, situated in an undulating dune landscape in Wassenaar, 10 kilometres north of the city center of  The Hague, Netherlands, was designed in 1938, by Harry Colt and C.H. Alison.

The championship course was set up with par 72.

Format 
All participating teams played two qualification rounds of stroke-play with six players, counted the five best scores for each team.

The eight best teams formed flight A, in knock-out match-play over the next three days. The teams were seeded based on their positions after the stroke-play. The first placed team was drawn to play the quarter final against the eight placed team, the second against the seventh, the third against the sixth and the fourth against the fifth. In each match between two nation teams, two 18-hole foursome games and five 18-hole single games were played. Teams were allowed to switch players during the team matches, selecting other players in to the afternoon single games after the morning foursome games. Games all square after 18 holes were declared halved, if the team match was already decided.

The eight teams placed 9–16 in the qualification stroke-play formed Flight B, to play similar knock-out match-play to decide their final positions.

Teams 
16 nation teams contested the event. Each team consisted of six players.

Players in the teams

Winners 
Two-times-champions team Sweden won the opening 36-hole qualifying competition, with a score of 19 over par 739, five strokes ahead of team France. This was the fourth time in a row Sweden won the stroke-play competition.

Tied individual leaders in the 36-hole stroke-play competition was Delphine Bourson, France, Julie Hall (nee Wade), England, Anna-Carin Jonasson, Sweden,  and Catriona Lambert (later named Matthew), Scotland, each with a score of even par 144, one stroke ahead of nearest competitor.

Team England won the championship. Playing in their eleventh final they beat Spain 4–2 and earned their eighth title. Team France earned third place, beating Sweden 4–3 in the bronze match.

Results 
Qualification round

Team standings

* Note: In the event of a tie the order was determined by the better total non-counting scores.

Individual leaders

 Note: There was no official award for the lowest individual score.

Flight A

Bracket

Final games

* Note: Game all square after 18 holes declared halved, since team match already decided.

Flight B

Bracket

Final standings

Sources:

See also 
 Espirito Santo Trophy – biennial world amateur team golf championship for women organized by the International Golf Federation.
 European Amateur Team Championship – European amateur team golf championship for men organised by the European Golf Association.

References

External links 
 European Golf Association: Results

European Ladies' Team Championship
Golf tournaments in the Netherlands
European Ladies' Team Championship
European Ladies' Team Championship
European Ladies' Team Championship